Chenlu is a town in Yintai District, Tongchuan, Shaanxi province, China. , it has 2 residential communities and 13 villages under its administration.

See also 
 List of township-level divisions of Shaanxi

References 

Township-level divisions of Shaanxi
Tongchuan